The White Tank Mountains are a mountain range in central Arizona. The mountains are on the western periphery of the Phoenix metropolitan area, primarily flanked by the suburban cities of Buckeye to the southwest, and Surprise to the northeast. The mountain range is home to the White Tank Mountain Regional Park and is a regional recreation hub.

The range consists of a series of numerous ridges and canyons, and as such, lacks a single, prominent peak.

The mountain range was formed through tectonic activities as part of a detachment fault sometime in the mid-Tertiary period, about 30 million years ago.  Fairly young in geologic terms, it has not been subject to the forces of erosion for long and retains an extremely rugged topography composed of rocky fault ridges and deep canyons.  During seasonal heavy rainfall, accumulated water tends to rush rapidly through the steep canyons, over time scouring out a number of depressions or "tanks" in the white granite near the base of the mountains. These white tanks are the source of the mountains' name.

References

Mountain ranges of the Sonoran Desert
Mountain ranges of Maricopa County, Arizona
Mountain ranges of Arizona